Aída R. Kemelmajer de Carlucci (born 4 November 1945) is an Argentine jurist, lawyer, and author. She was a Justice of the Supreme Court of Mendoza from 1984 to 2010. Kemelmajer was a member of the drafting commission of the updated Commercial and Civil Codes of Argentina. Born in San Martín, Mendoza, Kemelmajer earned a PhD in Law and Social Sciences the University of Mendoza. She was a tenured professor of civil law at the School of Law of the National University of Cuyo.

Early life and education
Aída R. Kemelmajer was born on 4 November 1945 in San Martín, Mendoza to Jaique and Miguel Kemelmajer. As a teenager, she was a castmember of the theater of the Faculty of Economic Sciences of the National University of Cuyo.

She earned her PhD in Law and Social Sciences from the University of Mendoza.

Legal career
Governor of Mendoza Santiago Llaver appointed Kemelmajer to be the Supreme Court of Justice of Mendoza in 1984. She was the first Jew to join the court. Kemelmajer was a judge of the Supreme Court of Justice of Mendoza Province from 1984 to 2010.

Kemelmajer called for the decriminalization of abortion. In a 2006 case, she ruled that a public hospital, which refused to comply with provisions of article 86 of the Penal Code of Argentina, was required to terminate the pregnancy of a disabled and abused young woman.

Kemelmajer was a tenured professor of civil law at the School of Law of the National University of Cuyo. She taught private law at the university's School of Economic Sciences. She also taught postgraduate courses at universities in various European and Latin American countries. She was a contracted professor at the University I, II, X and XII of Paris, Genoa and Bologna. She was a professor of the Master in Bioethics and Law at the University of Barcelona, where she held membership in the university's Observatory of Bioethics and Law.

Kemelmajer was a member of the drafting commission of the updated Commercial and Civil Codes of Argentina, which have been in force since 2015. She was also part of a study commission for the unification of procedural norms for UNIDROIT and a UNESCO group on the precautionary principle. Kemelmajer is a member of the Scientific Committee of the International Union of Judicial Officers and the National Committee for Ethics in Science and Technology.

Kemelmajer has published dozens of books and more than 400 monographic articles. She has also conducted training courses for judges in Argentina and other Latin American countries.

Awards
Kemelmajer received a Diamond Konex Award in 2016. She has received degrees of Doctor Honoris Causa from universities in Argentina, Peru, and France.

Selected publications
La separación de hecho entre cónyuges
La capacidad civil del menor que trabaja
Los privilegios en el proceso concursal
La responsabilidad civil en el derecho de familia
La cláusula penal”; “Derecho real de superficie
Temas modernos de responsabilidad civil
Daños causados por dependientes
Responsabilidad del Estado por los errores judiciales
Protección jurídica de la vivienda familiar
Calificación registral de los documentos que tienen origen en decisiones judiciales
Justicia Restaurativa
El nuevo Derecho de Familia
Alimentos

Personal life
Kemelmajer married lawyer Nedo Carlucci in 1968. She has two children, Fabiana and Leandro.

References

1945 births
Living people
20th-century Argentine judges
21st-century Argentine judges
Academic staff of the National University of Cuyo
University of Mendoza alumni
People from Mendoza Province
Argentine women judges